Sister Act may refer to:
 Sister Act, a 1992 film directed by Emile Ardolino and starring Whoopi Goldberg
 Sister Act 2: Back in the Habit, a 1993 sequel film of Sister Act, directed by Bill Duke and starring Whoopi Goldberg
 Sister Act (musical), a musical adaptation of the film
 "Sister Act", an episode of That's So Raven
 "The Sister Act", an episode of The O.C.

See also
 Aly & AJ: Sister Act, a reality show
 "Doug's Sister Act", an episode of Doug